The FIL European Luge Natural Track Championships 1985 took place in Szczyrk, Poland. This was the first time the championships did not take place either in Austria or in Italy.

Men's singles

Women's singles

Men's doubles

Medal table

References
Men's doubles natural track European champions
Men's singles natural track European champions
Women's singles natural track European champions

FIL European Luge Natural Track Championships
Luge
Sport in Silesian Voivodeship
1985 in luge
1985 in Polish sport
Luge in Poland